James Whitney Young (born January 24, 1941) is an American astronomer who worked in the field of asteroid research.  After nearly 47 years with the Jet Propulsion Laboratory at their Table Mountain Facility, Young retired July 16, 2009.

He was a very prolific minor planet-observer of both physical properties and astrometric positions, and had discovered more than 250 asteroids since 2002, most of them from the main-belt, as well as several near-Earth objects, Mars-crossers and Jupiter trojans. He also  discovered SN 2004eg, an extra-galactic supernova.

The Florian asteroid 2874 Jim Young was named in his honor.

Biography 

James W. Young (aka Jim Young) was born in Portland, Oregon and recently retired as the resident astronomer of the Jet Propulsion Laboratory's Table Mountain Observatory (TMO) near Wrightwood, California having been with them for 47 years.

Young was the lead technical guide at the NASA exhibit of the Seattle World's Fair during 1962. It was there he was encouraged to apply for an 'assistant observer' and 'darkroom technician' position at the recently developed Table Mountain Observatory with its new  telescope which had just begun full operations in late 1962.

Table Mountain Observatory 

Along with Charles F. Capen, Jr. (TMO's first resident astronomer), Young carried out photographic synoptic patrols using specific colors (UV through IR) of Venus, Mars, Jupiter, and Saturn. Several technical reports were published of 'patrol' images of  Mars during two Martian apparitions (1964–65 and 1966–67). The 1964 inferior conjunction of Venus was well observed from TMO. Color astrophotography was carefully investigated for planetary imaging using recently developed high speed color film emulsions.

With the newly (1966) installed  Cassegrain/Coudé telescope, Young began his asteroid observations with JPL astronomers, Ellis D. Miner and Alan W. Harris. Asteroid rotational rates became his speciality soon thereafter and by 1980, over 30 publications in Icarus with  Alan W. Harris resulted in nearly half of the (then) known rotational rates of these small solar system bodies.

With the advent of powerful lasers, Young became involved with several projects that aimed lasers successfully, first at the Surveyor VII spacecraft on the Moon (1968), later as two laser ranging programs developed at JPL in the 1990s found their marks on low and high earth orbiting satellites, and finally to the Galileo spacecraft some 6 million kilometers from Earth. In each case, Young was responsible for aiming/tracking the  telescope on each successive target.

Hypersensitization 

Other noteworthy projects Young was involved in included the 1969 installation of a large planetary spectrograph utilizing the Coudé focus of the  telescope. Spectroscopic studies of the planet Venus were carried out by JPL astronomers, Andrew and Louise Young, with Jim Young assisting with hypersensitization of Eastman Kodak IR spectroscopic glass plates. Jim Young developed a new technique of cold storage for these extremely sensitive plates. His experimentation of 'clean' and properly washed plates, stored at −70 °C. for over two years, were without increased noise or loss of sensitivity. Previous experimenters could manage around a two-month reliability.

2-Micron All Sky Survey 

In 1998, Young was asked to be an official observer for the 2-Micron All Sky Survey (2MASS), a joint venture of Caltech (California Institute of Technology) and the University of Massachusetts Amherst (UMass). Young carried out observations for this project at Mount Hopkins (south of Tucson, Arizona) and at the Cerro Tololo Inter-American Observatory (CTIO) in Chile until 2000, all the while maintaining his full Table Mountain Observatory responsibilities for JPL.

Near Earth Objects 

Late in 2002, Young began his last asteroid research, centering on NEOs and comets that have been discovered by several NASA funded NEO search teams such as NEAT, LINEAR, LONEOS, Catalina Sky Survey (CSS), and Spacewatch. With the use of Astrometrica software, Young become an extremely prolific astrometrist for the Minor Planet Center (MPC) of the Smithsonian Astrophysical Observatory (SAO) in Cambridge, Massachusetts. The director of the MPC, Dr. Brian G. Marsden called Young the third most accurate and reliable observer in the world then.  He also co-authored and authored over 1500 MPECs (Minor Planet Electronic Circulars) and IAUCs (International Astronomical Union Circulars) during these last 7 years at JPL.  NASA awarded Young a three-year grant to further his studies of NEOs and comets for JPL and the MPC during the last years before his retirement.

In 2003 Young accepted a new responsibility as 'Astronomy Team Leader' at Table Mountain, and supervised a staff of three employees
in maintaining two optical telescopes (0.4 and 0.6 meter cassegrain systems), four CCD cameras, and a computer network of over 20
computers.  Young maintained the optical performance of the telescopes, and the vacuum requirements for the CCD cameras.  He also was
in charge of the telescope scheduling for all visiting astronomers and his staff.  TMO recently placed their new on-line webpage for
all users as well as the public (see below link).

List of discovered minor planets 

James Whitney Young is credited as "J. W. Young" by the Minor Planet Center with the discovery of 256 minor planets made between 2002 and 2009.

Outreach 

Young taught an astronomy extension course for the University of California, Riverside in 1969 and 1970 specifically for high school and junior college teachers and educators.

Young frequently lectures about his work to youth, school, civic, and church groups around the western USA.  In 2006 he attended the International Astronomical Union's (IAU) General Assembly 2006 in Prague, Czech Republic.  Young gave a presentation on his activities taking astrometric observations of NEOs and comets at Table Mountain Observatory in the S236 Symposium on August 14.  Young, and his wife Karen (a HS Science and Math teacher), hold annual star-parties for their local communities as an
Outreach Program.  The 13th annual event, was held on October 15, 2010.  The event was attended by approximately 80 people, with many
school children, parents, and Boy Scouts present.  With six telescopes, many from members of the High Desert Astronomical Society (HiDAS),
participants viewed the moon, and later when the clouds cleared in the east, a shadow transit of Io across Jupiter's cloud surface was seen.

Mr. Young spoke at the Imiloa Astronomy Center in Hilo, Hawaii on December 23, 2010.  Young's presentation, entitled "The First Asteroid
Discovery to Near-Earth Hazards" featured Scott Manley's visualization titled, '1980-2010 Asteroid Discoveries', a six-minute
version (made especially for this presentation, with a re-mix of the music "Transgenic" from Trifonic Music, LLC).  Still in Hilo, Mr. Young also gave
an evening fireside at the Hilo Stake Center of the Church of Jesus Christ of Latter-Day Saints, entitled, "The Creation as Viewed by an Astronomer".
This same fireside was given in Dallas, Texas; Atlanta, Georgia; and Medina, Ohio in May, 2011.

On the afternoon of June 5, Young held a viewing of the Venus transit from Wrightwood, California for the local community.  Mr. Young's 6-inch telescope was used
with a solar filter for the 80-100 people who attended, as well as photography to record the event with a 2000mm telephoto lens.

Honors 

The Florian asteroid 2874 Jim Young, discovered by Edward Bowell in 1982, was named in his honor.

Memberships and affiliations

Asteroid meanings

See also 
 List of minor planet discoverers

References

External links 
 TMO website
 Astrophotography site
 Professional Photography Site

1941 births
20th-century  American astronomers
21st-century  American  astronomers
Discoverers of asteroids

Living people
NASA people
People from Wrightwood, California
Scientists from California
Scientists from Portland, Oregon